Lake Land'Or is a census-designated place in Caroline County, Virginia, United States. The population as of the 2010 census was 4,223.

References

External links
Lake Land'Or Property Owners' Association

Census-designated places in Caroline County, Virginia
Census-designated places in Virginia